Paul Ferris may refer to:
 Paul Ferris (composer) (1941–1995), English film composer
 Paul Ferris (footballer) (born 1965), Northern Irish former footballer and now physiotherapist
 Paul Ferris (Scottish writer) (born 1963), Scottish writer and criminal
 Paul Ferris (Welsh writer) (1929–2018), Welsh biographer and novelist